Rinker may refer to one of the following individuals:

 Al Rinker (1907–1982), singer
 Laurie Rinker (born 1962), golfer
 Lee Rinker (born 1960), golfer
 Travis Rinker (born 1968), association football (soccer) player

See also

 Mom Rinker's Rock
 Rinka Falls
 Rinke
 Rinker Group
 Rinker School of Building Construction